Casey Key is a barrier island off the coast of Southwest Florida, located south of Siesta Key. Casey Key is part of the North Port—Sarasota—Bradenton Metropolitan Statistical Area.

History
Casey Key is erroneously named after Captain John Charles Casey as a result of a U.S. Coast and Geodetic Survey chart published in 1851. Captain John Casey and his army were settled at Casey's Key, located south of the island, at the time.

References

Gulf Coast barrier islands of Florida
Islands of Sarasota County, Florida
Beaches of Sarasota County, Florida
Beaches of Florida
Islands of Florida